Hayley Nicole Kayla Jensen (born 7 October 1992) is a New Zealand cricketer. She lives in Australia, where she played for the ACT Meteors and in the Women's Big Bash League.

In June 2016, Jensen was banned from cricket for six months by Cricket Australia for betting AUD 2 on the first men's Test match between New Zealand and Australia at the Gabba in November 2015.  In August 2018, she was awarded a central contract by New Zealand Cricket, after touring Ireland and England in the previous months. In October 2018, she was named in New Zealand's squad for the 2018 ICC Women's World Twenty20 tournament in the West Indies.

In January 2020, she was named in New Zealand's squad for the 2020 ICC Women's T20 World Cup in Australia. She was the leading wicket-taker for New Zealand in the tournament, with seven dismissals in four matches. In February 2022, she was named in New Zealand's team for the 2022 Women's Cricket World Cup in New Zealand. In June 2022, Jensen was named in New Zealand's team for the cricket tournament at the 2022 Commonwealth Games in Birmingham, England. In August 2022, she was signed as an overseas player for Trinbago Knight Riders for the inaugural edition of the Women's Caribbean Premier League.

Personal life
In April 2019, Jensen married Australian cricketer Nicola Hancock.

References

External links
 
 Hayley Jensen at CricketArchive via New Zealand Cricket

1992 births
Living people
New Zealand women cricketers
New Zealand women One Day International cricketers
New Zealand women Twenty20 International cricketers
Cricketers from Christchurch
New Zealand LGBT sportspeople
LGBT cricketers
Lesbian sportswomen
Canterbury Magicians cricketers
Northern Districts women cricketers
Otago Sparks cricketers
Melbourne Stars (WBBL) cricketers
Melbourne Renegades (WBBL) cricketers
Perth Scorchers (WBBL) cricketers
Hobart Hurricanes (WBBL) cricketers
Victoria women cricketers
ACT Meteors cricketers
Trinbago Knight Riders (WCPL) cricketers
Cricketers at the 2022 Commonwealth Games
Commonwealth Games bronze medallists for New Zealand
Commonwealth Games medallists in cricket
Medallists at the 2022 Commonwealth Games